Bath Spa University is a public university in Bath, England, with its main campus at Newton Park, about  west of the centre of the city. The university has other campuses in the city of Bath, and one at Corsham Court in Wiltshire.

The institution gained full university status in August 2005, having been previously known as Bath College of Higher Education, and later Bath Spa University College.

History 
The institution can trace its roots back to the foundation of the Bath School of Art in 1852, following the impact of The Great Exhibition of 1851.

In 1946, Bath Teacher Training College was opened on the Newton Park campus, as part of the post-war initiatives to fill wartime teaching shortages. It was a women's college offering two year courses, under the Principal Mary Dawson. The present institution was formed in 1975 as Bath College of Higher Education by the merger of Bath Teacher Training College and Bath College of Domestic Science. In 1983 Bath Academy of Art also merged into the college.

In 1992, the college was granted degree-awarding powers and in 1997 adopted the name Bath Spa University College. In March 2005 the institution was granted university status, becoming Bath Spa University in August 2005.

In 2013, the university was the UK's sixth-largest provider of teacher education.

Campuses

Newton Park 

The Newton Park campus, to the west of Bath near the village of Newton St Loe, is the largest of the university's three main campuses. It is here that courses from all schools are taught, with the exception of art and design and most post-graduate courses. The campus is in Newton Park, in grounds designed by English landscape architect Lancelot "Capability" Brown and leased from the Duchy of Cornwall.

The campus has buildings from a mixture of ages. These include the Grade I listed Main House built between 1762 and 1765 by Stiff Leadbetter for Joseph Langton MP; the remnants of the 14th-century Newton St Loe Castle, a scheduled monument also with Grade I listed status; and Grade II* listed stable buildings, gardens and a walled garden.

It is the university's only campus to have student accommodation on site, and is also home to the Students Union. The site has a lake, nature reserve, woodlands and arable farmland. The site underwent extensive development in the 2010s.

'Commons' academic building 
In the summer of 2012, work began on the development of a new academic building called "Commons", roughly in the centre of the Newton Park campus. Next to the academic building is an outside amphitheatre, primarily for use by the School of Music and Performing arts. The building was officially opened on 5 June 2014 by film producer Lord Puttnam.

Michael Tippett Centre 
The Michael Tippett Centre is the only purpose-built concert hall in Bath. The building has many teaching rooms and spaces, and the hall is used for lectures, mainly by the School of Music and Performing Arts. The hall is also used for exhibitions, musical performances and plays from student performers as well professional acts from around the country.

University Theatre 
The University Theatre, completed in 2006, was part of a £5.7m scheme designed by Fielden Clegg Bradley Architects LLP. It consists of a 186-seat auditorium with backstage and technical facilities, and three large teaching studios. The venue is used by the School of Music and Performing Arts for teaching actors, directors, production managers, choreographers and dancers.

Bath School of Art and Design, Sion Hill, Bath 
The Sion Hill campus is in the north of Bath, in the Lansdown district.  This campus houses the Bath School of Art and Design and the majority of art and design courses are taught here. Its history extends to the original Bath School of Art which was founded in 1852. One of the earliest Masters of the school was Anthony Carey Stannus, an Irish painter noted for marine scenes, who later helped establish a society which evolved into the Royal Ulster Academy. Until 2009, the university also owned the nearby Somerset Place. The sale of this listed Georgian crescent was intended to finance a new campus in the city centre. This development, alongside the Dyson School of Design Innovation, did not proceed due to planning issues relating to the chosen riverside site.

Corsham Court, Corsham 

The university has a specialist centre for postgraduate research and teaching in Corsham Court, Corsham,
Wiltshire. The university developed this centre in 2008 after an absence of more than 20 years from the site. Corsham Court became the home of the Bath Academy of Art (now Bath School of Art and Design and part of the university) when its premises were destroyed during the Second World War. Walter Sickert, who taught there, was also a mentor to Lord Methuen RA, owner of the Court.  The centre handles the majority of postgraduate courses, and includes development support for research projects, postgraduate workshops, studios and seminar rooms providing facilities for the academic schools, specialist facilities for music, photography, film and textiles, a library and dedicated librarian, shared quiet study and social learning spaces for Masters and PhD research students, a common room space, a university research office which works with schools on the development of funding bids to external agencies, and a gallery space - managed by the Bath School of Art and Design in support of undergraduate and postgraduate curriculum activities.

Rush Hill, Bath
This campus is located in the Southdown area of Bath.  It is situated next to Bath Community Academy (formerly Culverhay School) and was formerly the school's Humanities block. The campus is the home to most of the university's Postgraduate Certificate in Education secondary and middle years education courses, including history, music, English, geography, mathematics and religious education.  Facilities at the campus are not as extensive as those found in Newton Park but there are IT facilities and a common room.

Additional teaching sites

The university maintains smaller satellite teaching spaces around Bath for use by students on certain courses, often those that require large amounts of space that are not available at the other campuses.

 Dartmouth Avenue, Bath was developed as a series of painting and media studios as well as a project space for year two students by the Bath School of Art and Design. This was to offset the loss of space incurred with the sale of Somerset Place. The site has been expanded into an adjoining building to accommodate creative studios and a second, larger, project space (the first now being predominantly used for life drawing classes).
 Burdall's Yard, Bath is an Arts Centre for the School of Music and Performing Arts. The centre is used as a teaching, rehearsal and performance space and also hosts cultural events. These have included Party in the City (Bath Festival) and a UK Songwriting Festival gig with singer/songwriter Eddi Reader.
 Ashman's Yard, Bath is home to the Theatre Production Centre for the School of Music and Performing Arts. Located between Newton Park campus and Bath City centre, it was formally opened by the Vice Chancellor, Christina Slade, in 2012. Students based here undertake practical work on the BA (Hons) theatre production course. Facilities include a construction workshop, costume workshop, prop making workshop, production office with Mac editing suite, and a student common room.
 Artswork Media Ltd at Paintworks, Bristol is the university's media production company that is run by media professionals and third year students. It offers training, professional practice and experiential learning for students of various programmes. It provides a production office, edit suites, lighting equipment and video cameras.
 It also includes the Bath Academy of Media Makeup among its affiliates.

Expansion 

Since 2012, substantial development has been undertaken at the Newton Park campus and plans exist for further development in the future, subject to being granted planning permission. The campus buildings were gradually refurbished and modified to deal with the influx of students expected in the 2010s. In 2011 the Duchy of Cornwall, the university's landlord, raised objections to these plans.

Locksbrook Campus
The site would become a new home for Bath School of Art and Design, as the Sion Hill campus did not provide enough academic space for the university's needs. The proposals detail changes that would be made to car parking provision on the site, as well as a more general transport plan for the campus. The factory was designed by Nicholas Grimshaw, completed in 1977 and Grade II listed in 2013.

In 2016, the purchase went ahead, and the planning application for the redevelopment was approved by Bath and North East Somerset Council in September 2017. Remodelling and refurbishment was again designed by Grimshaw Architects, and the building was opened as the Locksbrook Campus in October 2019.

Academic profile

Rankings and reputation

 
In 2005, 2006 and 2008 the university was named in the top 10 modern British universities by The Sunday Times, at positions 8, 5 and 8 respectively. The university was again ranked 8th best modern university in the UK by The Sunday Times in their 2016 university guide.

According to the 2014 Research Excellence Framework assessment, 51% of the research undertaken at the university was either world-leading or internationally significant, up from 19% in 2008. Acceptance rate was 12%.

Bath Spa University was ranked in 2017 as one of the top five creative universities in the UK by Which?s student survey.

 Partnership and collaboration 
The university has formed partnerships with a number of regional Further Education Colleges and institutions. Under the partnership, students take the first year of their higher education course in their local college and, if successful, the rest of their course at Bath Spa University. The British and Irish Modern Music Institute campus in Bristol has all of its courses verified by Bath Spa University.
 
The partners are:
Circomedia
City of Bath College
City of Bristol College
New College, Swindon
Weston College
Wiltshire College at Trowbridge and Salisbury
British and Irish Modern Music Institute in Bristol

 Student satisfaction 

The university has seen a significant dip in student satisfaction in recent years, slipping to 113th place in the UK with an overall satisfaction rate of 71.7% in 2021 according to the Office for Students.  In 2015, by contrast, Bath Spa University was ranked joint 20th in the United Kingdom with 90% student satisfaction, 4% above the national average of 86%. In 2013 and 2014, student satisfaction was 87% and 89% respectively.

 Student life 

 Student accommodation 

The university currently offers accommodation to 2,264 students in several locations around the Bath area, as well as on its main Newton Park campus.

 Newton Park Campus 

The Newton Park Campus currently houses 868 students in single, shared and en-suite study bedrooms. The accommodation forms two groups of buildings at either end of the campus, known as Lakeside and Gardens. Bus stops by the library building and Lakeside accommodation service the U5 bus. Both groups of accommodation have access to laundrette facilities. Because of the limited availability of parking, students living on campus are not permitted to bring a car, however bicycle racks and some motorcycle parking spaces are available.

In June 2013, work began on the development of a new "student village" in the main Newton Park campus, known as Gardens, which houses 561 first year students in separate "houses" of up to ten students. Building work was completed during the summer of 2014 in time for the start of the academic year in October. Work on the surrounding landscaping and car parks was completed during early 2015.

Mail services at the university are handled at a building called 'The Vinery', which also contains the estates and management team and is located adjacent to the Students' Union building, and next to the estates and management workshops and garages. The university also has two Amazon Lockers on campus, situated in the Refectory and outside Stanton building.

 City accommodation 

 Green Park House: A 461-bed property located in the centre of Bath, available for new students starting in September 2016. This accommodation offers en-suite rooms in shared flats, townhouses with shared facilities, studios, and "twodios" (two study bedrooms with shared bathroom and kitchen facilities). The building also provides four accessible rooms on the ground floor. There are two accessible studios and two en-suite rooms within a cluster flat. The property has been built using classic Bath Stone, taking design inspiration from historical photographs that show a building of similar style occupying this location in the 1930s. 
 Waterside Court: Offers 316 en-suite bed spaces and is run by student accommodation company Unite Students. It is next to the Charlton Court accommodation on the Lower Bristol Road, and is only a short distance from the centre of Bath and has a nearby bus stop with buses running to the centre as well as the university itself.
 Charlton Court: Offers 294 en-suite bed spaces and is run by Unite Students. It is located next to the Waterside Court accommodation on the Lower Bristol Road.
 Twerton Mill: In 2015 the university acquired 277 rooms at the new Twerton Mill development on the Lower Bristol Road. These rooms were made available as of the 2015/2016 academic year. The development is a carless site, with only four total parking spaces; three disabled spaces and one maintenance space. This development consists of a mixture of en-suite and traditional town houses with shared bathrooms and kitchens. Run by CRM, facilities at Twerton Mill include: laundry facilities, common room, secure bicycle storage, inclusive bills, basic Endsleigh contents insurance included in the tenancy and wifi with a base speed of 50Mb wired.
 Bankside House:''' Situated 10 minutes from the Sion Hill campus, and comprises 10 flats making a total of 40 student bed spaces. It is near the Sion Hill campus, the Circus, Dartmouth Avenue and City of Bath College

 Students' Union 

The main Students' Union facilities are at the Newton Park campus, although the Union maintains a presence in all campuses. The Main union building runs a bar, café, gym and shop, and hosts regular events throughout the academic year. There are 20 sports societies, 40 interest societies and 10 sports clubs run by the union, many of which compete in the BUCS. The sports facilities include rugby and football pitches at the top of the campus, as well as a netball court and changing facilities inside the walled garden adjacent to the union building. The walled garden itself is also a social space, featuring BBQs, games tables, seating and tables, a small pond, greenhouses and small allotment style areas. The Union is in charge of organising the Freshers events, as well as the Winter and Summer balls. It also has facilities to run health campaigns and give academic advice to students, volunteering and skill development opportunities, travel opportunities, and it liaises directly with the university and organisations nationally and in the local area to campaign about and discuss issues that affect students.

The Union also has its own student card called Student Zest, founded by students in 2012 which offers discounts on goods and services offered in over 100 local businesses. There is a dedicated website that deals with matters concerning this card.

The Students' Union building at Newton Park campus was refurbished during the summer of 2014, doubling the size of shop, reconfiguring the bar/cafe area, improving the gym, and updating the toilet facilities. There is also a new footpath around the front entrance of the building improving access. The Students' Union is also working with the university, the student body, and architects, to produce a long-term plan to completely rebuild the Union.

Alumni community
Bath Spa University's growing alumni community is a network of over 80,000 graduates, former students and staff, honorary graduates, friends and benefactors. It publishes an annual alumni magazine and promotes raising philanthropic income for a wide range of important projects for the university, particularly the Bath Spa Students Fund and bursaries. The president is Mary Berry, who is a former student of the Bath College of Domestic Science and is the recipient of an honorary doctorate from the university.

Oak Tree Day Nursery
Oak Tree Day Nursery was established in 1995 and operates from two adjoining houses in the parkland grounds of the university's Newton Park campus. It is a full day-care nursery offering both full and part-time places for the children of university staff and students as well as the local community. It has won numerous awards, including The Baby Quality Award in 2011, the Children's and Young People's Rights Gold Award in 2012, and the Director of Public Health Award in 2013.

Notable people

Academic staff

Naomi Alderman, novelist
David Almond, novelist
Joe Bennett, musician and writer
Dexter Dalwood, artist
Mahinda Deegalle, scholar and writer
Carrie Etter, poet
Nathan Filer, novelist and poet
Aminatta Forna, novelist
Jeremy Gardiner, modern British landscape painter
Maggie Gee, novelist
Eliane Glaser, writer and broadcaster
David Harsent, poet and TV scriptwriter
Philip Hensher, novelist, critic and journalist
William Hughes, editor and critic
Nicholas Jose, novelist
Tim Liardet, poet and critic
John Newsinger, author
Olivette Otele, the first black woman to become professor of History in UK Higher Education
Richard Parfitt, musician
Kate Pullinger, novelist
James Saunders, composer
Gavin Turk, artist
Steve Voake, children's author
Fay Weldon, novelist
Gerard Woodward, novelist and poet
Lance Workman, psychologist and writer

 Alumni 

Mary Berry, food writer
Harrison Birtwistle, composer
Manolo Blahnik, shoe designer
Glenn Brown, English painter, Turner Prize winner
Tracey Corderoy, award-winning children's writer
Sir Graeme Davies, engineer, academic, and former Vice-Chancellor of the University of Liverpool, the University of Glasgow and the University of London
Roger Deakins, cinematographer
Peter Flannery, scriptwriter, author of Our Friends in the North 
Laura Ford, artist
Jason Gardener, athlete, Olympic gold medallist
Kate Garraway, television presenter
William Harbutt, artist
Ian Hargreaves, journalist
Salima Hashmi, acclaimed artist, cultural writer, painter and an anti-nuclear weapon activist.
Mo Hayder, British crime novelist
John Hitchens, artist, painter 
Sir Howard Hodgkin, artist, Turner Prize winner
Ema "Emika" Jolly, electronic music producer
Elizabeth Kay, writer and author of The Divide trilogy
Phil Kelly, expressionist painter
Kill It Kid, blues/grunge/Americana band, signed with EMI
Alastair King, TV and film composer, 
Daren King, contemporary English novelist
Jan Linton, electronic music producer and singer/songwriter
Joanna MacGregor, classical, jazz and contemporary pianist, and artistic director of the Bath International Music Festival
Sir Donald Maitland, British diplomat and British Prime Minister Edward Heath's press secretary 1970 to 1974
David Charles Manners, best-selling author and charity co-founder
Dame Hilary Mantel, writer and novelist. Twice awarded the Booker Prize.
Gordon Moakes, Bloc Party bassist and backing singer
Fred V & Grafix, drum and bass duo
Sally Nicholls, prize-winning British children's book author
Edward Piper, painter
Miller Puckette, mathematician and computer music researcher
Peter Randall-Page, artistTate Collection. Retrieved 2010-11-18.
Simon Relph, assistant film director and producer
Dame Anita Roddick, businesswoman, founder of The Body Shop
Davide Rossi, violinist, string arranger, composer and a record producer, working with Goldfrapp and Coldplay.
Axel Scheffler, illustrator
Tristram Shapeero, television director
Rob Magnuson Smith, author
Sir William Stubbs, educator and former Rector of the University of the Arts London.
Judith Trim
Jules Williams, writer, Director, Producer author of The Weigh Forward''
Evie Wyld, award-winning novelist and author

See also 
 Armorial of UK universities
 College of Education
 List of universities in the United Kingdom

References

External links 

 

 
Educational institutions established in 2005
2005 establishments in England
Universities UK